Diaporthe orthoceras is a fungal plant pathogen.

References

Fungal plant pathogens and diseases
orthoceras
Fungi described in 1828